William Fraser "Horsey" Browne (1903–1931) was a British army and Irish rugby international. He won 12 caps between 1925 and 1928. He started playing whilst serving as a lieutenant in the Duke of Wellington's Regiment.

Played for both Devonport Services RFC and United Services RFC.

References
Horsey Browne at Scrum.com
IRFU Profile

1903 births
1931 deaths
Irish rugby union players
Ireland international rugby union players
Duke of Wellington's Regiment officers
Rugby union props